A by-election was held for the Terengganu State Assembly seat of Kuala Besut on 24 July 2013 with nomination day on 12 July 2013. The seat of Kuala Besut fell vacant after the death of incumbent assemblyman, A. Rahman Mokhtar on 26 June 2013 from lung cancer. Dr. Mokhtar was an assemblyman from the United Malays National Organisation, a component party of the ruling Barisan Nasional coalition, which holds a 1-seat majority into the by-election. The by-election was contested by Tengku Zaihan Che Ku Abdul Rahman from UMNO and Azlan Yusof, who hails from the Pakatan Rakyat component Pan-Malaysian Islamic Party.

This by-election is viewed as critical by both the government and opposition. A win by Pakatan Rakyat would have resulted in a hung parliament with both coalition holding 16 seats, and potentially a fresh state election.

The by-election was won by BN's Tengku Zaihan with a slightly increased majority, thus keeping the government's wafer-thin 2-seat majority. Turnout in this by-election dropped by 7% compared to the turnout during the general election two months before.

Results

References 

Politics of Terengganu
2013 elections in Malaysia
2013 Kuala Besut by-election
Elections in Terengganu